Fell is a surname. Notable people with the surname include:

Alfred Fell (merchant) (1817–1871), early settler in New Zealand
Alfred Fell (rugby union) MB ChB (1878–1953), Scottish international rugby player (1901–1903)
Alison Fell (born 1944), Scottish poet and novelist
Anthony Fell (politician) (1914–1998), British Conservative Party politician
Anthony S. Fell, OC, Canadian businessman and chairman of RBC Capital Markets
Arthur Fell (1850–1934), English solicitor and Conservative Party politician
Barry Fell (1917–1994), zoologist and writer on epigraphy
Bill Fell QPM (1904–1986), New Zealand policeman
Bob Fell OAM (born 1930), Australian politician
Charles Fell (1844–1918), Mayor of Nelson, New Zealand and painter
Charles Fell (divine), D.D. (1687–1763), English Roman Catholic priest
Christine Fell (died 1998), taught English at the University of Nottingham
Clare Fell (1912–2002), British archaeologist
Claude Fell (1892–1972), former Australian rules footballer
Dafydd Fell (born 1970), political scientists 
David Fell (1869–1956), Scottish-born Australian politician
Derek Fell, writer and photographer of art, travel and garden books
Desmond Fell (1912–1992), South African cricketer
George Fell (1849–1918), American physician, worked on artificial ventilation and electrocution
Gerry Fell (footballer, born 1951)), English professional footballer
Gerry Fell (footballer, born 1898) (1898–1977), English footballer
Gideon Fell, fictional character created by John Dickson Carr
Graeme Fell, former 3000 meters steeplechase runner
Hans-Josef Fell, German Member of Parliament
Heather Fell, British modern pentathlete
Henry Fell (fl. 1672), was a Quaker missionary and writer
Honor Fell, DBE, Ph.D, D.Sc, FRS (1900–1986), British scientist and zoologist
James Fell (1821–1890), English-born merchant and political figure in British Columbia
Jeffrey Fell (born 1956), retired jockey and a Canadian Horse Racing Hall of Fame inductee
Jesse Fell, anthracite experimenter from Pennsylvania
Jesse W. Fell, Illinois businessman and friend of Abraham Lincoln
Jimmy Fell (1936–2011), English footballer
John Fell (bishop) (1625–1686), English churchman and influential academic
John Fell (Canadian politician) (1819–1901), Ontario businessman, farmer and political figure
John Fell (drummer), American drummer
John Fell (judge) (1721–1798), American merchant and jurist
John Fell (tutor) (1735–1797), English congregationalist minister and classical tutor
John Barraclough Fell (1815–1902), engineer
John Fell (industrialist) (1862-1955), Scottish born Australian businessman in shale oil extraction and oil refining
Julian Fell, winning contestant from the British game show Countdown
Júnior Fell (born 1992), Brazilian football player
Laura Fell, known as Darla Aquista, a fictional character in comic books published by DC Comics
Leonard Fell (died 1700), English Quaker
Les Fell (1920–2010), English footballer
Margaret Fell or Margaret Fox (1614–1702), one of the founding members of the Religious Society of Friends
Mark Fell (cricketer) (born 1960), former English cricketer
Mary Fell (born 1947), American poet and academic
Matthew Fell (1875–1957), Australian rules footballer
Michael Fell (born 1963), California criminal lawyer and former prosecutor
Norman Fell (1924–1998), American actor of film and television
Patrick Fell (1940–2011), Roman Catholic priest, convicted of being a commander of an IRA active service unit
R. A. L. Fell (1895‑1973) was a British classical scholar and writer
R. B. Fell CB was the 4th Commander of the Ceylon Defence Force
Richard Fell, British High Commissioner to New Zealand from 2001 to 2006
Rita Fell (1935–2004), also known as Rita Mills, Australian singer
Sam Fell, animator
Samuel Fell (1584–1649) Dean of Christ Church, Oxford
Shane Fell (born 1967), former Australian rules footballer
Simon Fell (politician), British politician
Simon H. Fell, bassist and composer
Stuart Fell, professional actor and stuntman
Terry Fell (1921–2007), American country musician
Thomas Fell (1598–1658), lawyer, member of parliament and vice-chancellor of the duchy of Lancaster
Tom Fell (born 1993), English cricketer
Tony Fell (1931–2011), British businessman and musician
Wilfred Fell (1879–1920), former Australian rules footballer
William Fell (writer) (1761–1848), English writer
William Scott Fell (1866–1930), Australian shipping merchant and politician